Don Myers (February 2, 1932) was a former member of the Kansas House of Representatives from 1993 to 2011 representing the 82nd district. In 2010, the Americans for Prosperity - Kansas Chapter gave him a 90% evaluation on conservative issues.

Myers, who has a BS in mechanical engineering, worked as a senior specialist engineer at Boeing.

He is a member of the American Legion, Derby Chamber of Commerce, Derby First Christian Church, National Rifle Association and Veterans of Foreign Wars. He is married to Mary Myers and has three children, Jerry, Lane and Sherry. He lives in Derby, Kansas.

Committee membership
 Energy and Utilities
 Veterans, Military and Homeland Security (Chair)
 Aging and Long Term Care
 Economic Development and Tourism

Major donors
The top five donors to Myers' 2008 campaign:
Koch Industries - $1,000
AT&T - $1,000
Kansas Optometric Association - $750 	
Kansas Chamber of Commerce and Industry - $750 	
Kansas Medical Society - $750

References

External links
 Official website
 Kansas Legislature - Don Myers
 Project Vote Smart profile
 Kansas Votes profile
 State Surge - Legislative and voting track record
 Campaign contributions: 1998, 2002, 2004, 2006, 2008

Republican Party members of the Kansas House of Representatives
People from Fredonia, Kansas
Living people
Conservatism in the United States
1932 births
20th-century American politicians
21st-century American politicians